Jalbhe is a village in Jalandhar district of Punjab State, India. The village is administrated by a [sarpanch] (Gian Chand) who is an elected representative of village as per Panchayati raj (India).

See also
List of villages in India

References

External links
List of villages in Jalandhar district at Census of India, 2011

Villages in Jalandhar district